Sauchie railway station served the town of Sauchie, Clackmannanshire, Scotland from 1873 to 1930 on the Devon Valley Railway.

History 
The station opened in October 1873 by the Devon Valley Railway. To the north was Auchinbaird Siding which gave access to the pits nearby. The station closed to both passengers and goods traffic on 22 September 1930.

References

External links 

Disused railway stations in Clackmannanshire
Railway stations in Great Britain opened in 1873
Railway stations in Great Britain closed in 1930
Former North British Railway stations
1873 establishments in Scotland
1930 disestablishments in Scotland
Alloa